The Canterbury Stakes is an Australian Turf Club Group 1 Thoroughbred horse race for horses aged three years old and upwards at weight for age, over a distance of 1300 metres, held annually at Randwick Racecourse in Sydney, Australia in March.

History

The race was always run at Canterbury Park Racecourse, but after the Australian Jockey Club and the Sydney Turf Club merged, the new club implemented major program changes and moved to Rosehill. Since 2014 the event has been held at Randwick Racecourse.

Distance
1929–1972 - 6 furlongs (~1200 metres)
1973–2003 - 1200 metres
2004–2007 - 1300 metres
2008 - 1550 metres
2008 onwards - 1300 metres

Grade
1929–1978 - Principal race
1979–2012 - Group 2 race
 2013 onwards - Group 1

Venue
 1929–1996 - Canterbury Park Racecourse
 1997–1999 - Rosehill Gardens Racecourse 
 2000–2003 - Canterbury Park Racecourse
 2004–2007 - Rosehill Gardens Racecourse 
 2008 - Canterbury Park Racecourse
 2009–2013 - Rosehill Gardens Racecourse
 2014 onwards - Randwick Racecourse

1932 racebook

Gallery of noted winners

Winners

 2023 - Artorius
 2022 - Forbidden Love
 2021 - Mizzy  
 2020 - The Bostonian
 2019 - Trapeze Artist
 2018 - Happy Clapper
 2017 - Le Romain
 2016 - Holler
 2015 - Cosmic Endeavour
 2014 - Appearance
 2013 - Pierro
 2012 - More Joyous
 2011 - More Joyous
 2010 - Hot Danish
 2009 - All Silent
 2008 - Mentality
 2007 - Malcolm
 2006 - Paratroopers
 2005 - Dance Hero
 2004 - Yell
 2003 - Defier
 2002 - Empire
 2001 - Shogun Lodge
 2000 - Easy Rocking
 1999 - Kidman’s Cove
 1998 - Quick Flick
 1997 - All Our Mob
 1996 - Sprint By
 1995 - Miss Kariba
 1994 - Al Akbar
 1993 - Big Dreams
 1992 - Alishan
 1991 - Show County
 1990 - Straussbrook
 1989 - At Sea
 1988 - At Sea
 1987 - Placid Ark
 1986 - Avon Angel
 1985 - Chimes Square
 1984 - Sir Dapper
 1983 - Emancipation
 1982 - Manikato
 1981 - Turf Ruler
 1980 - Stage Hit
 1979 - Bernard
 1978 - †race not held
 1977 - Romantic Dream
 1976 - Hartshill
 1975 - Leica Show
 1974 - Favoured
 1973 - I’m Scarlet
 1972 - Playbill
 1971 - Baguette
 1970 - Broker’s Tip
 1969 - Fair Law
 1968 - Cabochon
 1967 - Prince Max
 1966 - Academy Star
 1965 - Aureo
 1964 - Eskimo Prince
 1963 - Kevejon
 1962 - Sky High
 1961 - Sky High
 1960 - Wanton Lass
 1959 - Up and Coming
 1958 - ‡race not held
 1957 - Prince Jambo
 1956 - Starover
 1955 - Star Realm
 1954 - Iroquois
 1953 - Regoli
 1952 - Joy Lad
 1951 - San Domenico
 1950 - San Domenico
 1949 - Bernbrook
 1948 - Gay Monarch
 1947 - Shannon
 1946 - Good Idea
 1945 - Sleepy Fox
 1944 - Tea Rose
 1943 - Katanga
 1942 - Yaralla
 1941 - Reading
 1940 - Beaulivre
 1939 - Beau Vite
 1938 - Gold Rod
 1937 - The Marne
 1936 - Arachne
 1935 - Bulldozer
 1934 - Lough Neagh
 1933 - Chatham
 1932 - Holdfast
 1931 - Holdfast
 1930 - Holdfast
 1929 - Amounis

† Change in scheduling of race from spring to autumn 
‡ Meeting abandoned 

Notes:
  2021 Mizzy promoted as winner after disqualification of Savatiano for positive swab.

See also
 List of Australian Group races
 Group races

External links 
First three placegetters Canterbury Stakes (ATC)

References

Group 1 stakes races in Australia